"Blame It on the Funk" is the single from Memphis rappers Indo G & Lil' Blunt in 1994 & featured on their 1995 album, The Antidote. It is a parody or adaptation of the Jacksons' "Blame It on the Boogie".

References 

1994 songs
Indo G songs